Vinod Kumar Singh is an Indian politician and member of the Communist Party of India (Marxist–Leninist) Liberation. Singh is a member of the Jharkhand Legislative Assembly from the Bagodar constituency in Giridih district in 2005, 2009 and 2019.

References

People from Giridih district
Jharkhand MLAs 2005–2009
Jharkhand MLAs 2009–2014
Jharkhand MLAs 2019–2024
Living people
Year of birth missing (living people)